Sergio Esteban Riffo Díaz (born March 17, 1997) is a professional Chilean footballer. He was born in Valparaíso and currently plays for San Antonio Unido

Club career
After having no chances to play for Everton de Viña del Mar in the Chilean Primera División, in 2017 he moved to Mexican club Celaya in the Ascenso MX. In 2020, he returned to Chile to play for Primera B side Deportes Valdivia.

References

External links
 

1997 births
Living people
People from Valparaíso
Chilean footballers
Chilean expatriate footballers
Chile under-20 international footballers
Association football forwards
Association football midfielders
Everton de Viña del Mar footballers
Club Celaya footballers
Irapuato F.C. footballers
Deportes Valdivia footballers
C.D. Arturo Fernández Vial footballers
San Antonio Unido footballers
Primera B de Chile players
Chilean Primera División players
Ascenso MX players
Liga Premier de México players
Segunda División Profesional de Chile players
Chilean expatriate sportspeople in Mexico
Expatriate footballers in Mexico
Chilean expatriates in Mexico
Sportspeople from Valparaíso